Michael Young Jr. (born February 11, 1999) is an American football wide receiver who is a free agent. He played college football at Notre Dame and Cincinnati.

Early years
Michael Young Jr was a 3-star recruit from St. Rose, Louisiana. He played high school football at Destrehan High School.

College career
Young committed to Notre Dame on July 20, 2016 and played three seasons for the Fighting Irish from 2017 to 2020. On April 12, 2020, Young announced his transfer to the University of Cincinnati and played two seasons for the Bearcats from 2020 to 2021. During his college career, Young had 862 yards receiving and 7 touchdowns at both schools. After the 2021 college football season, Young announced he was going to enter the 2022 NFL draft.

Statistics

Professional career
Young went undrafted in the 2022 NFL Draft.

Indianapolis Colts
Young was signed by the Indianapolis Colts as an undrafted free agent following the NFL draft. He was waived by the Colts on August 16, 2022.

Houston Texans
On October 27, 2022, Young was signed to the Houston Texans practice squad. He was released from the practice squad on November 15, 2022.

References

External links
Cincinnati Bearcats bio
Notre Dame Fighting Irish bio

Living people
American football wide receivers
Players of American football from Louisiana
Notre Dame Fighting Irish football players
Cincinnati Bearcats football players
Indianapolis Colts players
Destrehan High School alumni
People from St. Rose, Louisiana
1999 births
Houston Texans players